RRP15-like protein is a protein that in humans is encoded by the RRP15 gene.

This gene encodes a protein that co-purifies with human nucleoli. A similar protein in budding yeast is a component of pre-60S ribosomal particles, and is required for the early maturation steps of the 60S subunit.

References

Further reading

Ribosomal proteins